Oksana Cherevko (born 23 December 1979) is a Kyrgyzstani swimmer. She competed in the women's 200 metre breaststroke event at the 1996 Summer Olympics.

References

External links
 

1979 births
Living people
Kyrgyzstani female breaststroke swimmers
Olympic swimmers of Kyrgyzstan
Swimmers at the 1996 Summer Olympics
Place of birth missing (living people)